Bwizibwera is a township located in Kashari County, Mbarara District.

Location

It is located in Rwanyamahembe Subcounty, in Kashari County,  Kashari South Constituency in Mbarara District. And is the Main town of Kashari County.

Overview 
Bwizibwera (Runyankore: clear waters), started as small trading town on Ibanda road. 
In December 2017, the township was elevated to the Town Council status. It is Kashaari's biggest town and is considered to be the most peaceful town of western Uganda with very welcoming people. It hosts the Headquarters of Mbarara District. It has friendly people and is a booming town .

Points of Interest
 Headquarters of Kashaari County
 Health Centre IV
 EBO SACCO headquarters

References

Mbarara District
Populated places in Western Region, Uganda